Duet is an album by trumpeter Lester Bowie  and drummer Phillip Wilson recorded in 1978 and released on the Improvising Artists label. It features three duet performances by Bowie and Wilson.

Reception
The Allmusic review by Michael G. Nastos awarded the album 4 stars, stating, "There is a certain static electricity generated in this series of three duets from trumpeter Bowie and drummer/percussionist Wilson. Certainly they feed off each other's energy in counterpointed reverie, but the music goes beyond being merely spontaneous or made up on the spot. The cohesion and musicality they employ is purely delightful and eminently listenable over this 40-minute span".

Track listing
All compositions by Lester Bowie & Phillip Wilson
 "Duet" - 2:40
 "TBM" - 14:40
 "Finale" - 15:36
Recorded at Blue Rock Studio in New York City on January 19, 1978

Personnel
Lester Bowie – trumpet
Phillip Wilson – drums
David Baker – engineer
Paul Bley – producer

References

1978 albums
Lester Bowie albums
Improvising Artists Records albums